The 1996 Miller Genuine Draft 200 was a CART race that happened at the Milwaukee Mile. It happened on June 2, 1996. It was the 7th round of the 1996 IndyCar season.

Race

Lap 1
At the start of the race, Parker Johnstone spun at turn 2. The first full-course caution was out.

Lap 13
Top 6: Paul Tracy, Emerson Fittipaldi, Gil de Ferran, Christian Fittipaldi, Robby Gordon and Michael Andretti.

Lap 38
Michael Andretti takes the lead after overtaking Paul Tracy at turn 4.

Lap 71
Hiro Matsushita had a fire on the back of his car during his pitstop.

Lap 78
After pitstops, Al Unser Jr. leads, with Michael Andretti in second.

Lap 100
Halfway through -> Top 6: Al Unser Jr., Michael Andretti, Paul Tracy, Emerson Fittipaldi, Christian Fittipaldi and Greg Moore.

Lap 128
Second full course caution was out after Raul Boesel had a big crash on turn 2. The green flag came out at lap 148.

Lap 177
Top 6: Al Unser Jr., Michael Andretti, Emerson Fittipaldi, Paul Tracy, Greg Moore and Christian Fittipaldi.

Lap 183
Third full course caution came out, as Mark Blundell was the third victim of turn 2 wall.

Lap 195. 5 to go
The green flag came out. Michael Andretti took the lead from Al Unser Jr. The Penske Racing driver also lost second place for his teammate Paul Tracy.

Lap 197. 3 to go
Fourth full course caution came out, as Greg Moore nearly lost the car coming out turn 4. The restart came out at lap 199.

Lap 200. Last Lap
Fifth full-course caution. Parker Johnstone crashed at turn 3. Michael Andretti won under the yellow flag.

Final results
 Michael Andretti 200 laps
 Al Unser Jr. +0.146
 Paul Tracy +0.206
 Emerson Fittipaldi +1.549
 Greg Moore +24.420
 Christian Fittipaldi +1
 Bobby Rahal +3
 André Ribeiro +3
 Gil de Ferran +4
 Jimmy Vasser +4
 Adrian Fernandez +4
 Scott Pruett +4
 Alex Zanardi +5
 Bryan Herta +5
 Maurício Gugelmin +6
 Parker Johnstone +7
 Robby Gordon +9
 Jeff Krosnoff +9
 Juan Manuel Fangio II +13
 Eddie Lawson +16
 Eliseo Salazar +16
 Mark Blundell Broken suspension
 Michel Jourdain Jr. +18
 P. J. Jones +19
 Roberto Moreno +21
 Raul Boesel Contact at turn 2
 Stefan Johansson Poor handling
 Hiro Matsushita Broken exhaust

Point Standings
After 7 of 16 races
 Jimmy Vasser 95 points
 Al Unser Jr. 75 points
 Scott Pruett 51 points
 Michael Andretti 51 points
 Greg Moore 46 points
 Paul Tracy 45 points
 André Ribeiro 43 points
 Christian Fittipaldi 41 points
 Gil de Ferran 41 points
 Bobby Rahal 32 points

References

Miller Genuine Draft 200
Milwaukee Indy 225
Miller Genuine Draft 200